(Blue Heaven Blues) is an album by the Swedish rock band Imperiet, released in 1985, and produced in Stockholm by American producer, Jeff Eyrich.

Track listing
"CC Cowboys" – 4:05
""(The Crime of the Century) – 5:22
"" – 3:47
"" (Dutch Porcelain) – 4:39
"" (Teenage-Jesus) – 3:10
"" (Blue Heaven Blues) – 6:23
"Fat City" – 4:09
"" (Modern Men) – 3:59
"" (Peace) – 6:28

1985 albums
Imperiet albums